Devonian tetrapods include fishapods and amphibians that lived during the Devonian Period.

Elpistostegalia

Ichthyostegalia

Timeline of genera

See also
 Carboniferous tetrapods
 Permian tetrapods

References 

 List of